Naif is a locality in Deira side of Dubai, United Arab Emirates. It is a commercial and residential locality. Considering the nearby localities, Naif is larger in size. It is one of the oldest localities. The residents of this locality are mainly South Asians. The coordinates of Naif are N 25.27153° and E 55.30512°.

Naif has the second-highest population density of all communities in Dubai (after Ayil Nasir).

Fire in Naif Souq 
In 2008, A fire broke out in the Naif Souq and around 183 shops were burned down. The Dubai Municipality built a new building which has almost double the capacity of the old building.

References

External links 

 "One year after lockdown: how Dubai's Naif community is striving to get back to normal. Residents were under strict stay-home orders from March 31 until April 26 of last year to control the spread of Covid-19", "The National News", April 22, 2021

Communities in Dubai